Nörr may refer to:

 Nörr Stiefenhofer Lutz, the former name of Noerr
 Narfi, father of Nótt in Norse mythology